The canton of Le Blanc-Mesnil is an administrative division of the Seine-Saint-Denis department, Île-de-France region, northern France. Its borders were modified at the French canton reorganisation which came into effect in March 2015. Its seat is in Le Blanc-Mesnil.

It consists of the following communes:
Le Blanc-Mesnil
Drancy (partly)

References

Cantons of Seine-Saint-Denis